Olga Nikolayevna Jarkova (born January 11, 1979, in Moscow, USSR) is a Russian curler. She has represented Russia twice at the Winter Olympics, in 2002 and 2006.

Career
Jarkova has been curling for Russia internationally since 1999, when she threw fourth stones for Nina Golovtchenko at the World Junior Challenge where they won silver. She threw third stones that year at a disappointing last place finish in the World Junior Curling Championships. After this, she was back to throwing fourth stones. At the 2001 European Curling Championships she became skip of the Russian team. This move eventually paid off, as the team won the gold medal at the 2003 Universiade. They defeated Krista Scharf of Canada in the final. Jarkova remained as the Russian skip until 2005 when she was the team's alternate at the 2005 World Women's Curling Championship. She was the second at the 2005 European Championships and third at the 2006 Winter Olympics. Jarkova has been to two Olympics. She skipped the team in 2002, and placed last and in 2006 Russia placed fifth. She became European Champion in 2006 as part of Ludmila Privivkova's team.

References

External links

Living people
1979 births
Russian female curlers
Curlers at the 2006 Winter Olympics
Curlers at the 2002 Winter Olympics
Olympic curlers of Russia
Curlers from Moscow
European curling champions
Universiade medalists in curling
Universiade gold medalists for Russia
Medalists at the 2003 Winter Universiade